Soproni VSE is a Hungarian football club in Sopron. The club's colours are purple and white. They won the Nemzeti Bajnokság II two times in 1945 and 1946, but they have never played in the first league. In 2011, the club won the championship in the third league, so in the 2011-12 season they were promoted to the Nemzeti Bajnokság II. It is a successor of FC Sopron.

Current squad

Sources:

References

External links
 Official website

 
Football clubs in Hungary
1921 establishments in Hungary